Coelho is a Portuguese surname meaning "rabbit". Notable people with the surname include:

 Arnaldo Cézar Coelho, Brazilian football referee
 Bento Coelho da Silveira (ca. 1630-1708), Portuguese painter
 Carlos Coelho, Portuguese politician
 Carlos Pinto Coelho, Portuguese journalist, writer, photographer and media professor.
 Claire Coelho, Australian football (soccer) player.
 Duarte Coelho, Portuguese nobleman and colonial administrator
 Dyego Rocha Coelho, Brazilian football player
 Eduardo Teixeira Coelho, maker of comic books
 Eduardo Prado Coelho, Portuguese writer, journalist, columnist and university professor.
 Eliane Coelho, Brazilian soprano
 Elzo Coelho, Brazilian football player
 Evelina Coelho, Portuguese artist
 Fabián Coelho, Uruguayan football player
 Gaspar Coelho, Portuguese Jesuit
 Gonçalo Coelho, Portuguese explorer
 Henrique Maximiano Coelho Neto, Brazilian writer, politician, and professor
 Humberto Coelho, Portuguese football player
 Jaime Luiz Coelho (1916–2013), Brazilian Roman Catholic archbishop
 Jackson Avelino Coelho, commonly known as Jajá, Brazilian footballer born 1986
 Jackson Coelho Silva, Brazilian footballer
 José Dias Coelho, Portuguese painter and sculptor
 José da Silva Coelho, Goan Catholic writer
 Manuel Rodrigues Coelho, Portuguese organist and composer
 Maria de Belém Roseira Martins Coelho Henriques de Pina, Portuguese politician
 Mário Coelho Pinto de Andrade, Angolan poet and politician
 Nicolau Coelho, Portuguese explorer
 Nuno André Coelho, Portuguese footballer
 Nuno Miguel Prata Coelho, Portuguese footballer
 Paulo Coelho, Brazilian lyricist and novelist
 Paulo de Almeida Coelho, Portuguese Paralympic athlete
 Pedro Passos Coelho, Portuguese politician and prime minister
 Sara Pinto Coelho, Portuguese writer and playwright
 Tony Coelho, American congressman
 Joseph Coelho, poet

See also
 Engenheiro Coelho, a municipality in São Paulo state in Brazil.
 Pedro Manuel Oliveira Martins (born 1988), known as Coelho, Portuguese futsal player
 Conejo, a Spanish-language surname, variant of Coelho

Portuguese-language surnames
Surnames from nicknames